is a Japanese medley swimmer.

Major achievements
2006 Pan Pacific Swimming Championships
 200m individual medley 5th (2:01.50)
 400m individual medley 7th (4:22.41)
2007 World Aquatics Championships
 200m individual medley 9th (2:00.57)
 400m individual medley 15th (4:22.68)

Personal bests
In long course
 200m individual medley: 1:59.84 (August 2, 2008)
 400m individual medley: 4:16.18 (December 2, 2006)
In short course
 200m individual medley: 1:54.92 Asian, Japanese Record (February 22, 2009)
 400m individual medley: 4:05.15 Japanese Record (February 21, 2009)

References
 https://web.archive.org/web/20090422053724/http://www.tv-asahi.co.jp/w-swim2007/pc/players/0018.html

1984 births
Living people
Japanese male medley swimmers
People from Toyama Prefecture
Asian Games medalists in swimming
Swimmers at the 2006 Asian Games
Universiade medalists in swimming
Asian Games gold medalists for Japan
Medalists at the 2006 Asian Games
Universiade bronze medalists for Japan
Medalists at the 2005 Summer Universiade
Medalists at the 2011 Summer Universiade
20th-century Japanese people
21st-century Japanese people